The Roman Catholic Diocese of Yuci is a diocese in Yuci (Shanxi) in the Ecclesiastical province of Taiyuan, China.

History
 17 June 1931: Established as the Apostolic Prefecture of Yuci 榆次 from the Apostolic Vicariate of Taiyuanfu 太原府
 9 March 1944: Promoted as Apostolic Vicariate of Yuci 榆次
 11 April 1946: Promoted as Diocese of Yuci 榆次

Leadership
 Bishops of Yuci (Roman rite)
 Bishop John Baptist Wang Jin (1999-2014)
 Fr. Anthony H. Yang Guang-qi, O.F.M. (楊廣祺) (20 September 1955 – 11 November 1957)
 Bishop Pietro Ermenegildo Focaccia, O.F.M. (富濟才) (11 April 1946 – 12 August 1953)
 Vicars Apostolic of Yuci 榆次 (Roman Rite)
 Bishop Pietro Ermenegildo Focaccia, O.F.M. (富濟才) (9 March 1944 – 11 April 1946)
 Prefects Apostolic of Yuci 榆次 (Roman Rite)
 Fr. Pietro Ermenegildo Focaccia, O.F.M. (富濟才) (later Bishop; 16 January 1932 – 9 March 1944)

References

 Profile, GCatholic.org; accessed 27 September 2014.
 Profile, catholic-hierarchy.org; accessed 27 September 2014.

Roman Catholic dioceses in China
Christian organizations established in 1931
Roman Catholic dioceses and prelatures established in the 20th century
Religion in Shanxi